Höllriegelskreuth station is a railway station on the Munich S-Bahn in the district of Höllriegelskreuth, the industrial and business area of Pullach in the south area of Munich, Germany.

History

Höllriegelskreuth station - until 22 May 1977 called Höllriegelskreuth-Grünwald - had four tracks, one of them was used for freight transport. Since the electrification the station was the final stop of the electric motor coaches which circulated every 20 minutes. For this purpose, a separate locomotive shed, which was connected with other storage sidings, was established. Even before the introduction of the S-Bahn operation, the demolition of the building took place. In 1978, Deutsche Bundesbahn tore down the old reception building and replaced it with a new building.

References

Munich S-Bahn stations
Railway stations in Bavaria
Railway stations in Germany opened in 1891
1891 establishments in Bavaria